John Edward Hatton  (born 29 May 1933) is a former Australian politician, and a National Trust of Australia nominated Australian Living Treasure. He was the independent member of the Legislative Assembly of the New South Wales parliament for the seat of South Coast from 1973 to 1995. Notably, the allegations about police corruption which Hatton raised in Parliament resulted in the Wood Royal Commission. He is currently a social activist in his local community.

Early life and background
Hatton was born in Hammondville, New South Wales, the son of Harry and Florence Hatton. He was educated at Hammondville Public School, Hurlstone Agricultural High School and Armidale Teachers' College.

Hatton was the President of the New South Wales Shire of Shoalhaven before his entry into state politics. Hatton was the Foundation President and President for 15 years of the Shoalhaven Combined Progress Associations.

State parliamentary career
Hatton was the member for the New South Wales lower house seat of South Coast between 1973 and 1995. A measure of Hatton's local popularity occurred in the 1976 state election where he polled in excess of 77% of the first preference formal votes. Shortly after becoming elected, Hatton donated a parliamentary pay rise to charity because it had not been granted by an independent body. John Hatton was elected as an independent for this seat for 22 years through the Askin, Lewis, Willis, Wran, Unsworth, Greiner and Fahey governments to 1995.

Hatton used parliamentary privilege to expose organised crime in the Griffith mafia, police corruption and malfeasance within government departments and agencies. In 1994, by 46 votes to 45, he forced the minority Fahey Government to establish the Wood Royal Commission into Police Corruption. This ground-breaking royal commission overcame objections from the Independent Commission Against Corruption, led to widespread reform of the NSW Police Force and the establishment of the Police Integrity Commission.

Later life
Hatton continues to advocate for his local community. In 2009 he called for a Royal Commission into property and planning corruption in NSW.

Return to politics
In September 2010, Hatton announced his intention to stand with a team of 21 independents for the New South Wales Legislative Council at the state election on 26 March 2011. His running mate was small business owner and Community Independent Ian Scandrett who was second on the ticket.  Scandrett has since been elected twice to Wingecarribee Shire Council. The grouping of candidates were known as the John Hatton Independents Team. Hatton and his team were unsuccessful at the 2011 election.

Honours received
 Officer of the Order of Australia, General Division, 1999.
 Churchill Fellow 1989
 Jaycees Australia's Outstanding Young Man of the Year Award, Darwin 1970

Notes
a. The City of Shoalhaven was proclaimed in 1979.

References

1933 births
Living people
Members of the New South Wales Legislative Assembly
Independent members of the Parliament of New South Wales
Officers of the Order of Australia